Radiator is the second studio album by Welsh alternative rock band Super Furry Animals. It was released in August 1997 by Creation Records, and later the same year in the United States under Flydaddy Records. It peaked at number eight on the UK Albums Chart. In 2005, it was reissued with a bonus disc of other tracks from the time.

Singer Gruff Rhys has described Radiator as "more interesting" than the band's debut Fuzzy Logic with the group taking advantage of producer Gorwel Owen's "Atari computers, and banks of old vintage synths" to create an album which was "musically ... much more adventurous". In 2013, NME ranked it at number 92 in its list of the 500 Greatest Albums of All Time. The Radiator campaign also marked the first time the band worked with graphic artist Pete Fowler, who provided paintings for the album and accompanying singles' sleeve. The band felt working with Fowler had provided them with a distinct visual identity, and apart from Hey Venus! have collaborated together on each album since.

Release and reception

In 2000 Q magazine placed Radiator at number 73 in its list of the 100 Greatest British Albums Ever. Stylus Magazine named Radiator in a list of ten essential albums released by Creation Records in a 2003 article about the label. In a 2017 list of the 50 Best Britpop Albums, Pitchfork placed Radiator at number 39. In 2013, NME ranked it at number 92 in its list of the 500 Greatest Albums of All Time.

Track listing

 Some American releases were packaged with Out Spaced, the band's 1998 B-sides collection.

Personnel
Gruff Rhys – vocals, acoustic and electric guitars, Moog, claps
Huw Bunford – electric guitar, backing vocals
Cian Ciaran – electronics, Rhodes piano, piano, backing vocals, claps
Guto Pryce – bass, sub-bass, claps
Dafydd Ieuan – drums, percussion, backing vocals, piano
Les Morrison – banjo (on "Demons")
Gorwel Owen – E-Bow, samples, electric harpsichord, backwards Rhodes
Martin Smith – trumpet
Simon James – tenor sax and flute
Andrew Frizzell – trombone and alto sax
The Electra Strings:
Sonia Slany – violin
Jules Singleton – violin
Clair Arster – viola
Dinah Beamish – cello

References

External links

Radiator at YouTube (streamed copy where licensed)

Super Furry Animals albums
1997 albums
Creation Records albums
Albums produced by Gorwel Owen
Albums with cover art by Pete Fowler